Ahmed Madan (born 25 August 2000) is a Bahraini road cyclist, who currently rides for UCI WorldTeam .

Major results
2022
 1st  Time trial, Asian Under-23 Road Championships
 1st  Road race, National Road Championships

References

External links
 

2000 births
Living people
Bahraini male cyclists